The Office of the Prime Minister (commonly called the Prime Minster's Office or PMO;) is the political arm of the staff housed in the Office of the Prime Minister and Privy Council building that supports the role of the prime minister of Canada. Its staff provides provision of policy advice, information gathering, communications, planning, and strategizing. It should not be confused with the Privy Council Office (PCO), which is the top office that controls the Public Service of Canada and is expressly non-partisan. The PMO is concerned with making policy, whereas the PCO is concerned with executing the policy decisions made by the government.

Katie Telford manages the PMO, serving as Chief of Staff to Prime Minister Justin Trudeau since November 4, 2015. The position of Principal Secretary has been vacant since February 18, 2019.

Nomenclature
Officially titled the Office of the Prime Minister, the organization is widely referred to as the Prime Minister's Office and although the latter rendering of the name is completely unofficial, the office's English abbreviation is always given as PMO as opposed to OPM.

Unlike similar offices such as 10 Downing Street, the White House and even Rideau Hall, the Canadian prime minister's official residence of 24 Sussex Drive is not widely used as a metonym for the Prime Minister's Office. This is because, unlike those examples, the Canadian prime minister's official residence is not the site of any bureaucratic functions.  The former Langevin Block was occasionally (though rarely) used this way in media, as it is the seat of the PMO, but since it has been renamed, and instead media usually simply speak of staff "in the Prime Minister's Office" or decisions made "

Function
The PMO includes speech writers, strategists, and communications staffers who shape the prime minister's and Cabinet's message as well as keeping the prime minister informed on events that take place in government and across the country. They also act as a link between the political party organization and the government.

One of the most important roles of the PMO is related to government appointments, which are made on the advice of the prime minister. Thus, the PMO works with the Privy Council Office to aid in finding suitable candidates for the prime minister to put forward to the Crown for appointment to positions such as the federal governor general and provincial lieutenant governors, senators, Supreme Court justices, chairpersons of ministerial boards, heads of Crown corporations, and more.

History
After Jean Chrétien became Prime Minister, the PMO continued to be the central organ of the government. Chrétien greatly depended upon the PMO, especially his chief of staff, Jean Pelletier, who ran the office from 1993 to 2001, Percy Downe, who served as his director of appointments from 1998 to 2001 and chief of staff from 2001 to 2003, and his senior advisor, Eddie Goldenberg, who had spent his entire career working with Chrétien in various ministries. Chrétien's successor, Paul Martin, changed the structure of the PMO to more match that of the Executive Office of the President of the United States. For example, he introduced deputy chiefs of staff, who were responsible for areas such as communications and policy; re-established the position of director in the offices of the other ministers of the Crown, positions that were previously known as special assistants; and re-established the position of principal secretary, which had originally been created by Trudeau. Martin further, and significantly, increased the salary of the PMO's staff.

This model was largely retained by Martin's successor Stephen Harper, despite the recommendations of John Gomery following his investigation into the sponsorship scandal, when he concluded that the power of the PMO should be reduced. "The most troubling facts were that this aberration originated in the Prime Minister's Office in the first place and was allowed to continue for so long, despite internal audit reports, investigations, warnings and complaints by public servants involved in the actual contracts in question," Gomery said at a news conference.

References 

 J.E. Hodgetts "Prime Minister's Office The Canadian Encyclopedia.
 McMenemy, John. "Prime Minister's Office." The Language of Canadian Politics.
 Eddie Goldenberg, The Way It Works'' pages 40 to 45.

External links 
 Office of the Prime Minister
 Office of the Prime Minister YouTube channel

 
Government of Canada

Canada